Anna Maree Doig (born 18 December 1965 in Wellington) is a former freestyle and butterfly swimmer from New Zealand, who represented her native country at 1984 Summer Olympics in Los Angeles, California. She is now a seventh grade teacher at a middle school.

References
 New Zealand Olympic Committee

1965 births
Living people
New Zealand female swimmers
Olympic swimmers of New Zealand
New Zealand female freestyle swimmers
New Zealand female butterfly swimmers
Swimmers at the 1984 Summer Olympics
Swimmers from Wellington City